The Trip is a 2010 British comedy film directed by Michael Winterbottom. It is the first installment of Winterbottom's film adaptations of the TV series The Trip. The film stars Steve Coogan and Rob Brydon.

Cast 
 Steve Coogan as Steve Coogan
 Rob Brydon as Rob Brydon
 Rebecca Johnson as Sally
 Elodie Harrod as Chloe
 Dolya Gavanski as Magda
 Claire Keelan as Emma
 Justin Edwards as Steve's UK Agent
 Margo Stilley as Mischa
 Anna Stockton as Katherine
 Kerry Shale as Matt
 Marta Barrio as Yolanda

Reception 
The Trip film received positive reviews from American critics. The film holds an 89% approval rating on Rotten Tomatoes, based on 104 reviews with an average rating of 7.4/10. The website's critical consensus reads, "Amiable, funny and sometimes insightful, The Trip works as both a showcase for the enduring chemistry between stars Steve Coogan and Rob Brydon and an unexpected perusal of men entering mid-life crises." Metacritic gave the film an average score of 82 out of 100, based on 33 reviews, indicating "universal acclaim". Roger Ebert of The Chicago Sun-Times gave the film three stars out of four, Joshua Rothkopf of Time Out New York five, and Ben Kenigsberg of Time Out Chicago four. Manohla Dargis of The New York Times gave the film 90/100. Joe Morgenstern of The Wall Street Journal gave the film 80/100. Noel Murray of The A.V. Club gave the film a B rating, saying that "there was no reason the film couldn't have been even funnier." John Anderson of Variety said "viewers will barely stop laughing." Eric Kohn of IndieWire gave the film a B+. , the film had grossed $1,926,866, of which $77,904 was on its opening weekend in the US.

References

External links 
 

2010 films
2010 comedy films
2010s road movies
Films about actors
Films about comedians
Films set in England
Films shot in England
Films directed by Michael Winterbottom
British buddy films
British road movies
Films edited from television programs
British comedy films
2010s English-language films
2010s British films